Molineuf is a former commune in the Loir-et-Cher department in Centre-Val de Loire, France. On 1 January 2016, it was merged into the new commune of Valencisse.

See also
Communes of the Loir-et-Cher department

References 

Former communes of Loir-et-Cher
Loir-et-Cher communes articles needing translation from French Wikipedia